Botswana women's junior national softball team is the junior national team for Botswana.  The team competed at the 2007 ISF Junior Women's World Championship in Enschede, Netherlands where they finished sixteenth.  The team competed at the 2011 ISF Junior Women's World Championship in Cape Town, South Africa where they finished fifteenth.  The team competed at the 2013 ISF Junior Women's World Championship in Brampton, Ontario where they finished fifteenth.

References

External links 
 International Softball Federation

Junior softball
Women's national under-18 softball teams
Softball in Botswana
Youth sport in Botswana